KCipher-2 is a stream cipher jointly developed by Kyushu University and Japanese telecommunications company KDDI. It is standardized as ISO/IEC 18033–4, and is on the list of recommended ciphers published by the Japanese Cryptography Research and Evaluation Committees (CRYPTREC). It has a key length of 128 bits, and can encrypt and decrypt around seven to ten times faster than the Advanced Encryption Standard (AES) algorithm.

Notes

References 

 
 

Stream ciphers
Japanese inventions
KDDI